The 2018–19 Coupe de la Ligue was the 25th year for the league cup competition held in France. Forty-four clubs participated in the competition.

Strasbourg won their fourth Coupe de la Ligue title (their first in fourteen years) following a 4–1 win on penalties over Guingamp in the final.

Paris Saint-Germain were the five-time defending champions after winning the cup in the previous five seasons, but were eliminated in the quarter-finals after a 2–1 loss to Guingamp.

First round
Twelve first round matches were played on 14 August 2018.

Second round
Six second round matches were played on 28 August 2018.

Third round
The draw for the third round matches was held on 12 September 2018.

Round of 16
The draw for the Round of 16 matches was held on 14 November 2018.

Quarter-finals
The draw for the quarter-final matches was held on 19 December 2018.

Semi-finals
The draw for the semi-final matches was held on 10 January 2019.

Final

See also
 2018–19 Ligue 1
 2018–19 Ligue 2

References

External links
 Official website  

2018-19
France 2
League Cup